Civilian Warfare Gallery was an art gallery located in New York City's East Village in the early 1980's and was one of the founding galleries of the East Village art movement. Founded by artists Alan Barrows and Dean Savard, the gallery helped launch the careers of notable artists including David Wojnarowicz, Richard Hambleton, Luis Frangella, Greer Lankton, the Grey Organisation/Toby Mott and Jane Bauman among others.

History 

Originally founded as Civilian Warfare Studio in Dean Savard's storefront live/work painting studio at 526 East 11th Street, between Avenues A and B in the East Village, casual salons held with friends eventually led to the formation of a formal art gallery. After initial success in the small storefront, the gallery moved to a larger space on Avenue B at 10th Street across from Tompkins Square Park. A move to an even larger third location on 9th Street between Avenues B and C followed.

References 

Defunct art museums and galleries in Manhattan
East Village, Manhattan